In statistics, Samuelson's inequality, named after the economist Paul Samuelson, also called the Laguerre–Samuelson inequality, after the mathematician Edmond Laguerre, states that every one of any collection x1, ..., xn, is within  uncorrected sample standard deviations of their sample mean.

Statement of the inequality
If we let

 

be the sample mean and

 

be the standard deviation of the sample, then

 

If you instead define  then the inequality becomes

Comparison to Chebyshev's inequality

Chebyshev's inequality locates a certain fraction of the data within certain bounds, while Samuelson's inequality locates all the data points within certain bounds.

The bounds given by Chebyshev's inequality are unaffected by the number of data points, while for Samuelson's inequality the bounds loosen as the sample size increases. Thus for large enough data sets, Chebychev's inequality is more useful.

Applications

Samuelson's inequality may be considered a reason why studentization of residuals should be done externally.

Relationship to polynomials

Samuelson was not the first to describe this relationship: the first  was probably Laguerre in 1880 while investigating the roots (zeros) of polynomials.
  
Consider a polynomial with all roots real:
 
 
 	
Without loss of generality let  and let

  and 
 	
Then

 

and

 

In terms of the coefficients

 

Laguerre showed that the roots of this polynomial were bounded by

 

where

 

Inspection shows that  is the mean of the roots and that b is the standard deviation of the roots.

Laguerre failed to notice this relationship with the means and standard deviations of the roots, being more interested in the bounds themselves. This relationship permits a rapid estimate of the bounds of the roots and may be of use in their location.

References 

Statistical inequalities